Gorodok is a rural locality (a village) in Nikolskoye Rural Settlement, Ustyuzhensky District, Vologda Oblast, Russia. The population was 21 as of 2002.

Geography 
Kresttsy is the nearest rural locality.

References 

Rural localities in Ustyuzhensky District